The Washington Medal of Merit is one of three statutory civilian decorations issued by the state of Washington, the others being the Washington Medal of Valor and the Washington Gift of Life Award (formerly the Washington Gift of Life Medal). Washington law does not describe an order of precedence for state decorations, though the Medal of Merit is generally considered the state's highest honor.

Medal

Qualifications
All persons, living or dead, except elected officials and current political candidates, are eligible to receive the medal. The medal is bestowed by the Governor of Washington on the advice of the "medal of merit committee," which is composed of the governor himself, as well as the chief justice of the Washington State Supreme Court, the speaker of the Washington State House of Representatives, and the president of the Washington State Senate. The Washington Secretary of State serves as the committee's secretary. The process for nomination is not set by law, but, under current rules adopted by the committee, any person may nominate a qualified candidate through submission of a letter of nomination to the secretary of state who periodically presents received nominations to the committee for consideration.

While there are no residency requirements for the Medal of Merit, all recipients to-date were either born in Washington or lived there at the time of their decoration.

Design and presentation
The Medal of Merit is made from solid bronze. In addition to the recipient's name, the reverse reads "For exceptionally meritorious conduct in performing outstanding services to the people and state of Washington." By custom, the medal is awarded by the Governor to a slate of recipients during a joint session of the Washington State Senate and Washington State House of Representatives convened for that purpose. The authorizing legislation does not specify a frequency for issuing the medal, therefore, it has generally been awarded with irregularity.

Background

History

The Washington Medal of Merit was established by an act of the Washington Legislature in 1986 with the first medals presented after the reconvening of the legislature the following year. The medal's past recipients have included three nobel laureates.

Recipients 
1987
Warren G. Magnuson – United States Senator
Dorothy Bullitt – owner of KING-TV
Orville Vogel – agricultural scientist
Lester R. Sauvage – founder of the Hope Heart Institute
1988
Edward Carlson – chairman of United Airlines
William B. Hutchinson – founder of Fred Hutchinson Cancer Research Center
Henry M. Jackson – United States Senator
1989 
Julia Butler Hansen – member of the U.S. House of Representatives
Belding Hibbard Scribner – founder of Northwest Kidney Centers
Charles Odegaard – president of the University of Washington
1990 
James Reed Ellis – leader of Forward Thrust
Francis Penrose Owens – regent of Washington State University
1995
Kathleen Ross - founder of Heritage University
Michael Copass – director of emergency medicine at Harborview Medical Center
1998
E. Donnall Thomas – recipient of the Nobel Prize in Physiology or Medicine
Stanley O. McNaughton – president of PEMCO Insurance
Jacob Lawrence – artist
2003
Tom Foley – Speaker of the U.S. House of Representatives
Leland H. Hartwell  - recipient of the Nobel Prize in Physiology or Medicine
Helmut "Brownie" Braunsteiner – veterans' advocate
Ernest K. Gann – author
2007
Linda B. Buck - recipient of the Nobel Prize in Physiology or Medicine
Dale Chihuly - glass artist
Bonnie J. Dunbar - astronaut
Daniel J. Evans - Governor of Washington
2009
William H. Gates, Sr. - chairman of the Bill and Melinda Gates Foundation
Wilfred Woods - publisher of Wenatchee World
Emma Smith DeVoe+ - "Mother of Women's Suffrage" 
May Arkwright+ - founder of the Washington Political Equality League

+ awarded posthumously

See also
 Awards and Decorations of the Washington National Guard
 Washington Law Enforcement Medal of Honor

References

External links
Washington Secretary of State Medals of Merit and Valor

Decorations and medals of Washington (state)